The Diocese of Ekwulobia is a Latin Church ecclesiastical jurisdiction or diocese of the Catholic Church located in Anambra State, Nigeria. It is a suffragan diocese in the ecclesiastical province of the metropolitan Onitsha.

The first Bishop of Ekwulobia, Peter Ebere Okpaleke, was installed on 29 April 2020.

History
 5 March 2020: Established as Diocese of Ekwulobia from the Diocese of Awka.

The cathedral is St. Joseph's Catholic Church.

Leadership
 Bishop Peter Ebere Okpaleke (29 April 2020   – present)

See also
Roman Catholicism in Nigeria

References

Roman Catholic dioceses in Nigeria
Roman Catholic dioceses and prelatures established in the 21st century
Christian organizations established in 2020
Roman Catholic Ecclesiastical Province of Onitsha